The 1951 Chatham Cup was the 24th annual nationwide knockout football competition in New Zealand.

The competition was run on a regional basis, with regional associations each holding separate qualifying rounds.

Teams taking part in the final rounds are known to have included Eastern Suburbs (Auckland), Huntly Thistle, New Plymouth Old Boys, Napier High School Old Boys, Wanganui Old Boys, St. Andrews (Manawatu), Petone, Woodbourne (Marlborough), Riccarton, Northern (Dunedin), and Invercargill Thistle.

The 1951 final
Eastern Suburbs' Reg King became the sixth player — and the first since 1945 — to score a hat-trick in a Chatham Cup final. Eastern Suburbs' John Jakens set an unusual record, gaining his third consecutive winners medal, gaining those medals playing for three different teams (he had previously won with Petone in 1949 and Eden in 1950). The first half of the final was even with Northern having the better of the opening minutes and gaining the lead through Trevor McFarlane. Tony Frogley levelled the scores before the break. The second half was entirely Eastern Suburbs', despite playing much of it with ten men after Frogley left the field injured (this was in the days before substitutes were allowed). Centre-forward King put the Aucklanders ahead, and the lead was soon doubled by Jack Anderson. King scored twice more late on to complete an emphatic win. Mr. A. Aspen of Wellington became only the third referee to officiate at more than one final, having previously controlled the 1948 final.

Results

Final

References

Rec.Sport.Soccer Statistics Foundation New Zealand 1951 page

Chatham Cup
Chatham Cup
1951 domestic association football cups
September 1951 sports events in New Zealand